The Senior women's race at the 1984 IAAF World Cross Country Championships was held in East Rutherford, New Jersey, United States, at the Meadowlands Racetrack on March 25, 1984.   A report on the event was given in the Glasgow Herald.

Complete results, medallists, 
 and the results of British athletes were published.

Race results

Senior women's race (5 km)

Individual

Teams

Note: Athletes in parentheses did not score for the team result

Participation
An unofficial count yields the participation of 109 athletes from 24 countries in the Senior women's race.  This is in agreement with the official numbers as published.

 (6)
 (6)
 (6)
 (2)
 (6)
 (2)
 (6)
 (5)
 (6)
 (2)
 (6)
 (5)
 (6)
 (5)
 (5)
 (6)
 (3)
 (6)
 (5)
 (6)
 (1)
 (1)
 (6)
 (1)

See also
 1984 IAAF World Cross Country Championships – Senior men's race
 1984 IAAF World Cross Country Championships – Junior men's race

References

Senior women's race at the World Athletics Cross Country Championships
IAAF World Cross Country Championships
1984 in women's athletics